Andrej Hanták (born 29 October 1985 in Bratislava) is a Slovak football midfielder who currently plays for FC Petržalka 1898.

References

External links
Eurofotbal profile

1985 births
Living people
Slovak footballers
Association football midfielders
ŠK Slovan Bratislava players
FC Petržalka players
FK Bodva Moldava nad Bodvou players
MŠK Novohrad Lučenec players
FC DAC 1904 Dunajská Streda players
Slovak Super Liga players
Footballers from Bratislava